Jackson County Early College is a public high school located in Sylva, North Carolina. It opened as an alternative to Smoky Mountain High School in 2008 for those students willing to put in extra work to also earn a community college 2-year degree along with their high school diploma.  Jackson County Early College is a part of the Jackson County School System.  Although it is a separate school, students are able to participate in Smoky Mountain Extracurricular activities, such as Marching Band, Indoor Percussion, Jazz Band, and some Clubs.  It was originally located in Oaks Hall on the Southwestern Community College Campus in Webster, NC, where quarters were tight due to the increasing enrollment of the Early College and Southwestern Community College, but it moved in the Fall of 2010 to a building built by the county for the student's High School Classes.  This has also allowed for the ability of the enrollment to exceed 100. Jackson County Early College currently has an "A" rating.

See also
 Smoky Mountain High School

References

External links
 https://www.jcpsnc.org/jcec
 http://www.southwesterncc.edu/

Schools in Jackson County, North Carolina
Public high schools in North Carolina